Peniarth Manuscript 259B, known as Pomffred since it had previously been owned by the constable of Pontefract Castle, is a version of the Laws of Hywel Dda. Aneurin Owen assigned this manuscript the siglum Z in his Ancient laws and institutes of Wales. It is one of the Peniarth Manuscripts in the National Library of Wales. It was transcribed in the mid-sixteenth century by two hands: Richard Longford and his amanuensis, from an earlier exemplar owned by Einion ab Addain, who was serving a prison sentence in Pontefract at the time that it was copied.

Description 
This manuscript is unusual in that it is the sole law manuscript that was copied onto paper rather than parchment. The ninety-eight leaves measure 280 x 200mm, written in twenty-nine lines and two columns.

References 

National Library of Wales collections
Welsh manuscripts
Peniarth collection